Jules Rossignon (also known as Julio Rossignon; ? in France – 1883) was a French professor, writer, scientific agriculturist, and international coffee grower. He produced coffee on his farm, Las Victorias, which is now a national park. Rossignon served as a professor at the University of Paris and was a scientific director for the Belgian Colonization Company.

A species of turtle, Chelydra rossignonii, is named in his honor.

Selected works
 Proyecto de alumbrado de gas para la ciudad de Guatemala, presentado al Sr. Corregidor e individuos de la municipalidad (1846)
 Universidad de San Salvador : discurso pronunciado el 5 de diciembre 1851 para la apertura de las clases (1851)
 Manual de lechería y fabricación de quesos : precedido de algunos apuntes sobre la elección de las vacas lecheras (1858)
 Manual de barnices y preparación de charoles según los procederes mas recientes (1858)
 Manual del cohetero y polvorista, sea Compendio de pirotecnia (1859)
 Manual del Jardinero y Arbolista (1859)
 Manual de aceites y jabones : ó sea extracción de los aceites y grasas, y fabricación de los jabones con base de soda y potasa (1859)
 Manual del cultivo del añil y del nopal ó sea extracción del indigo, educacion y cosecha de la cochinilla, extracción de los principios colorantes de varias plantas tinctoriales (1859)
 Manual del cultivo del café, cacao, vainilla y tabaco en la America española y de todas sus aplicaciones (1859)
 Porvenir de la Verapaz en la República de Guatemala memoria dedicada al Consulado de Comercio de Guatemala (1861)
 Memoria dedicada al Consulado de Comercio de Guatemala (1861)
 Manual do Jardineiro e do arboricultor, ou Arte de compòr, dirigir e adornar toda a qualidade de jardins. De cultivar ... as flores, as hortalices ... formar latadas, aclimar as plantas exoticas na America meridional (1866)
 De la caña de azúcar, del laboreo del azucar (1867)
 Sociedad Económica de Amigos de Guatemala (1875)
 Republica de Guatemala en Centro America. Catalogo analitico y razonado de los objetos presentados por la república de Guatemala a la exposicion universal de Paris (1878), redactado por Julio Rossignon (1878)

References

Bibliography

Academic staff of the University of Paris
History of Guatemala
French male non-fiction writers
1883 deaths
19th-century French historians
19th-century French male writers